The Sandōkai is a poem by the eighth Chinese Zen ancestor Shitou Xiqian (Sekito Kisen, 700–790) and a fundamental text of the Sōtō school of Zen, chanted daily in temples throughout the world.

Title

The poem's title, "參同契", is pronounced Sandōkai in Japanese or Cāntóngqì in Mandarin Chinese. The characters, in particular the first, 參 (san or cān), can have several quite different meanings, and therefore the poem's title is susceptible to a variety of interpretations and translations.

English translations of the title, some more and some less literal, include "Merging of Difference and Unity", "Merging of Difference and Equality", "Agreement of Difference and Unity", "Harmony of Difference and Sameness", "Harmonious Song of Difference and Sameness", "Identity of Relative and Absolute", "Harmony of Relative and Absolute", "Harmony of Difference and Equality", and "Ode on Identity".

The title of the Sandōkai is the same as that of a 2nd-century Taoist text on alchemy, which is also known as the Cantong qi; in reference to the Taoist work, "參同契" is often translated as "the Kinship of the Three".

Text

Another translation by Rev. Master Jiyu-Kennett:

Text commentary
Toward the end of his life Shunryu Suzuki Roshi gave a series of lectures on the Sandokai. These have been published as the book Branching Streams Flow in the Darkness.

Sheng-yen published a commentary in English on both "Sandokai" ("Inquiry Into Matching Halves") and "The Precious Mirror of Samadhi" under the title The Infinite Mirror ((1990), Dharma Drum Publications ).

See also
 Five Ranks
 Song of the Precious Mirror Samadhi

References

External links
 Sandokai medieval Japanese and translated into English
Suzuki's Lectures and commentaries
Various English translations of the 參同契 – CAN TONG QI (TS’AN-T’UNG-CH’I)
Various English and Hungarian translations of the Sandōkai and another work by Shitou Xiqian, the Sōan ka

Zen texts
Chinese poems
Buddhist poetry
Chinese Buddhist texts
Tang dynasty poetry